Xylose ("wood") is a sugar first isolated from wood, and named for it.  Xylose is classified as a monosaccharide of the aldopentose type, which means that it contains five carbon atoms and includes an aldehyde functional group. It is derived from hemicellulose, one of the main constituents of biomass. Like most sugars, it can adopt several structures depending on conditions.  With its free aldehyde group, it is a reducing sugar.

Structure
The acyclic form of xylose has chemical formula .  The cyclic hemiacetal isomers are more prevalent in solution and are of two types: the pyranoses, which feature six-membered  rings, and the furanoses, which feature five-membered  rings (with a pendant  group).  Each of these rings is subject to further isomerism, depending on the relative orientation of the anomeric hydroxy group.

The dextrorotary form, -xylose, is the one that usually occurs endogenously in living things. A levorotary form, -xylose, can be synthesized.

Occurrence
Xylose is the main building block for the hemicellulose xylan, which comprises about 30% of some plants (birch for example), far less in others (spruce and pine have about 9% xylan). Xylose is otherwise pervasive, being  found in the embryos of most edible plants. It was first isolated from wood by Finnish scientist, Koch, in 1881, but first became commercially viable, with a price close to sucrose, in 1930.

Xylose is also the first saccharide added to the serine or threonine in the proteoglycan type O-glycosylation, and, so, it is the first saccharide in biosynthetic pathways of most anionic polysaccharides such as heparan sulfate and chondroitin sulfate.

Xylose is also found in some species of Chrysolinina beetles, including Chrysolina coerulans, they have cardiac glycosides (including xylose) in their defensive glands.

Applications

Chemicals 
The acid-catalysed degradation of hemicellulose gives furfural, a precursor to synthetic polymers and to tetrahydrofuran.

Human consumption 

Xylose is metabolised by humans, although it is not a major human nutrient and is largely excreted by the kidneys. Humans can obtain xylose only from their diet. An oxidoreductase pathway is present in eukaryotic microorganisms. Humans have enzymes called protein xylosyltransferases (XYLT1, XYLT2) which transfer xylose from UDP to a serine in the core protein of proteoglycans.

Xylose contains 2.4 calories per gram (lower than glucose or sucrose, approx. 4 calories per gram).

Animal medicine 

In animal medicine, xylose is used to test for malabsorption by administration in water to the patient after fasting. If xylose is detected in blood and/or urine within the next few hours, it has been absorbed by the intestines.

High xylose intake on the order of approximately 100 g/kg of animal body weight is relatively well tolerated in pigs, and in a similar manner to results from human studies, a portion of the xylose intake is passed out in urine undigested.

Hydrogen production 

In 2014 a low-temperature , atmospheric-pressure enzyme-driven process to convert xylose into hydrogen with nearly 100% of the theoretical yield was announced. The process employs 13 enzymes, including a novel polyphosphate xylulokinase (XK).

Derivatives 
Reduction of xylose by catalytic hydrogenation produces the sugar substitute xylitol.

See also
 Saccharophagus degradans
 Xylonic acid
 Xylose metabolism

References

Aldopentoses